Charles Everett Koop (October 14, 1916 – February 25, 2013) was an American pediatric surgeon and public health administrator. He was a vice admiral in the U.S. Public Health Service Commissioned Corps, and served as the 13th Surgeon General of the United States under President Ronald Reagan from 1982 to 1989. According to the Associated Press, "Koop was the only surgeon general to become a household name" due to his frequent public presence around the HIV/AIDS crisis of the 1980s.

Koop was known for his work on tobacco use, AIDS, and abortion, and for his support of the rights of children with disabilities.

Early life and education
Koop was born in Brooklyn, New York, the only child of John Everett Koop (1883–1972), a banker and descendant of 17th-century Dutch settlers, and Helen (née Apel) Koop (1894–1970). In 1937, he earned his Bachelor of Arts in zoology degree from Dartmouth College, where he was given the nickname "Chick" (occasionally used for his first name, Charles, but here an allusion to a chicken coop). His interest in medicine followed a year in the hospital after a childhood skiing accident and brain hemorrhage. He earned his MD degree from Cornell Medical College in 1941 and Doctor of Science degree in medicine from the University of Pennsylvania in 1947.

Medical career
From 1946 to 1981, Koop was the surgeon-in-chief at the Children's Hospital of Philadelphia (CHOP). Koop was able to establish the nation's first neonatal surgical intensive care unit there in 1956.  He helped establish the biliary atresia program at CHOP when Japanese surgeon Morio Kasai came to work with him in the 1970s.  He also established the pediatric surgery fellowship training program at CHOP.  During his tenure there he graduated 35 residents and 14 foreign fellows, many of whom went on to become professors of pediatric surgery, directors of divisions of pediatric surgery, and surgeons-in-chief of children's hospitals.

Koop became a professor of pediatric surgery in 1959 and professor of pediatrics in 1971 at the University of Pennsylvania School of Medicine.

While a surgeon in Philadelphia, Koop performed groundbreaking surgical procedures on conjoined twins, invented techniques which today are commonly used for infant surgery, and saved the lives of countless children who otherwise might have been allowed to die. He invented anesthetic and surgical techniques for small bodies and metabolisms and participated in the separation of several sets of conjoined twins whose condition other physicians at the time considered hopeless. He first gained international recognition in 1957 by the separation of two female pygopagus infants (conjoined at the pelvis) and then, again, in 1974 by the separation of two ischiopagus twins (conjoined at the spine) sharing a liver, colon, and parts of the intestines with their entire trunks merged.

Koop was active in publishing articles in the medical literature.  Koop later wrote that:   Koop helped rectify this by publishing his own findings and results.  Additionally, he became the first editor of the Journal of Pediatric Surgery when it was founded in 1966.

In contrast to his years as surgeon general, when it was his policies and speeches that had bearing on other people, his years as an operating pediatric surgeon involved a more individualized, direct, hands-on effect on others.  During the course of his long career, for example, he performed some seventeen thousand inguinal hernia repairs and over seven thousand orchidopexies (surgery for correcting undescended testicle).  He developed new procedures, such as the colon interposition graft for correcting esophageal atresia (congenital lack of continuity of the esophagus) or ventriculoperitoneal shunts for treatment of hydrocephalus (accumulation of excessive cerebral spinal fluid in and around the brain causing neurological problems).  He also tackled many difficult cases ranging from childhood cancer to surgeries done on conjoined twins, of which he and his colleagues operated upon ten pairs during his 35-year tenure.  In all he operated on many children and babies with congenital defects 'incompatible with life but amenable to surgical correction'.

In 1976, Koop wrote The Right to Live, The Right to Die, setting down his concerns about abortion, infanticide, and euthanasia.  Koop also took some time off from his surgical practice to make a series of films with Christian apologists Frank Schaeffer and his father Francis Schaeffer in 1978, entitled Whatever Happened to the Human Race? based on the book of the same title that was previously written by the elder Schaeffer. Frank Schaeffer and his associate, Jim Buchfuehrer provided a private, five hour screening to U.S. Rep. Jack Kemp and wife Joanne on their home that, according to Frank Schaeffer's account of the late evening and early morning event in his book Crazy for God, led to both the Schaeffers and Koop obtaining "...access to everyone in the Republican Party".

President Ronald Reagan, shortly after his first inauguration, appointed Koop Deputy Assistant Secretary for Health in February 1981. It was understood that Reagan would later nominate Koop to be surgeon general.

Surgeon General of the United States

As expected, Koop was nominated to be Surgeon General of the United States by Reagan later in 1981. Many liberal politicians and women's groups opposed the nomination because of Koop's very conservative views and strong anti-abortion beliefs. His nomination was confirmed by the U.S. Senate on November 16, 1981, by a vote of 60–24. He was sworn into office on January 21 the following year.

Abortion
Though Koop was opposed to abortion on personal and religious grounds, he declined to state that abortion procedures performed by qualified medical professionals posed a substantial health risk to the women whose pregnancies were being terminated, despite political pressure to endorse such a position.

Koop Report
Koop, an opponent of abortion, resisted pressure from the Reagan administration in 1987 to prepare a report stating that abortion was psychologically harmful to women. He said it was not a public health issue but a moral one. Koop assigned an assistant, George Walter, the task of researching the matter. Walter obtained a list of articles from the Centers for Disease Control and Prevention (CDC), authored mostly by CDC abortion-surveillance staff, and consulted with Alan Guttmacher Institute personnel. Walter wrote a draft report on his findings and gave it to Koop.

In a January 10, 1989 letter to Reagan, Koop said that there was insufficient evidence to substantiate issuing the finding desired by the administration. He also commented about how some of the president's advisers thought that "it was a foregone conclusion that the negative health effects of abortion on women were so overwhelming that the evidence would force the reversal of Roe v. Wade".

Koop did not present the draft report to Reagan and claimed he never approved it. In March 1989, the "Koop Report" became public after it was subpoenaed and became part of a Congressional subcommittee hearing. Although there were allegations that the report had not been released previously because it was biased, the document contained all arguments on both sides of the issue.

Tobacco
In his 1988 Report of the Surgeon General, it was reported that nicotine has an addictiveness similar to that of heroin or cocaine. Koop's report was somewhat unexpected, especially by those who expected him to maintain the status quo in regard to his office's position on tobacco products. During his tenure, in 1984, Congress passed legislation providing for new, rotated health warning labels on cigarette packs and required advertising to include the labels. Those labels remain unchanged today. New labels containing graphic depictions of smoking-caused illness and death have been announced by the FDA, but are on hold pending the outcome of tobacco industry legal challenges. Koop issued a challenge to Americans in 1984 to "create a smoke-free society in the United States by the year 2000."  As Surgeon General, he released eight reports on the health consequences of tobacco use, including the first report on the health consequences of involuntary tobacco smoke exposure. During Koop's tenure as Surgeon General, smoking rates in the United States declined significantly from 38% to 27%.

AIDS
Koop was Surgeon General when public health authorities first began to take notice of AIDS. For his first four years in office, Koop, the nation's top health officer, was prevented from addressing this health crisis, for reasons he insisted were never fully clear to him but that were no doubt political. Koop wrote the official U.S. policy on the disease, and in 1988 he took unprecedented action in mailing AIDS information to every U.S. household. Gay activists and their supporters were unhappy with the way in which he targeted gay sex and the risk of infection through anal sexual intercourse as primary vectors of the disease, but Koop was unapologetic, claiming such activities entail risks several orders of magnitude greater than other means of transmission.  Religious activists, upset over the pamphlet's frank discussion of sexual practices and advocacy of condom use, called for Koop's resignation. Koop also infuriated some former supporters by advocating sex education in schools, possibly as early as the third grade, including later instruction regarding the proper use of condoms to combat the spread of AIDS.  While a straightforward telling to the public about the disease was controversial, Koop was also criticized by some health activists who claimed that his office had not gone far enough in attempting to develop a cure or vaccine, reducing the role of his office to educating the public on health concerns.

Disability
In April 1982, a child born in Bloomington, Indiana, was diagnosed with Down syndrome as well as esophageal atresia with tracheoesophageal fistula.  Six days later, after court involvement and parental discussion involving disagreement among physicians about whether or not to treat the baby or let him die, the baby died, having been denied surgical treatment to correct his esophageal atresia and tracheoesophageal fistula. Baby Doe, as he would be known, became a symbol for newborns with birth defects, children with disabilities, and the debate over infanticide.  Koop was not initially involved with the Baby Doe case but had a special interest in it.  As a pediatric surgeon in Philadelphia, he and his colleagues had operated on 475 such babies during his 35 years there, with ever-increasing survival rates.  During his last eight years in active practice, Koop never lost a full-term baby upon whom he had operated to correct esophageal atresia.  It was due to this background that he became actively involved in championing policies to protect the rights of newborns with disabilities, which led to Congress passing the Baby Doe Amendment.

Style 
These four issues, combined with Koop's personality and his willingness to make use of mass media, brought to the office of Surgeon General a higher public profile than it previously had merited; he is, for instance, the first Surgeon General to have been the subject of a popular song – "Promiscuous" by Frank Zappa. He was interviewed by Ali G for comedic effect.

Koop was well known for his mustache-less beard and colorful bow ties. During much of his day-to-day work, Koop wore the Surgeon General's US Public Health Service Commissioned Corps uniform, a uniform similar to that of a U.S. Navy Vice Admiral's.  During his tenure he re-instated the daily wearing of the PHS uniform by the officers of the PHS.

Later career
Following his career as Surgeon General, Koop was on The Firestorm Solutions Expert Council. Koop hosted a documentary series in 1991, simply titled C. Everett Koop, M.D. It aired for six episodes on NBC.

Koop and other investors established drkoop.com in 1997, during the dot-com bubble. This medical information website was one of the first major online sources of health information. Critical review of the site content revealed that many of the private care listings, medicinal recommendations, and medical trial referrals were paid advertisements. The company went bankrupt in 2001. Koop continued to endorse Life Alert bracelets for the elderly.

In 1999 testimony before Congress, Koop minimized concerns from health groups about the severity of allergies to latex gloves. It was later discovered that a company that manufactured latex gloves had previously paid Koop $650,000 for consulting work.

Koop held three professorships at Dartmouth Medical School, where he was also the senior scholar at the C. Everett Koop Institute.

Personal life
In early 1968, Koop's son David was killed in a rock climbing accident on Cannon Mountain during his junior year at Dartmouth College. Koop later wrote that because of his son's death he thought, "I might be better able to help parents of dying children, but for quite a while I felt less able, too emotionally involved.  And from that time on, I could rarely discuss the death of a child without tears welling up into my eyes." Years later, he and his wife wrote a book called Sometimes Mountains Move to help others who had lost a child. Koop's son Rev. Norman Koop attended Eastern Baptist College (now Eastern University) and graduated in 1969. The following year the elder Koop was elected to the board of trustees, becoming the first non-Baptist member of the board.

In February 2007, Elizabeth Koop, his wife of nearly 70 years, died.  On April 17, 2010, he married Cora Hogue, a former staff member of Tenth Presbyterian Church in Philadelphia.

Death and legacy
At a November 2010 news conference, Koop spoke from a wheelchair and said that he was "very, very deaf" and legally blind. Koop died on February 25, 2013, at the age of 96 at his home in Hanover, New Hampshire. According to a Koop aide, he had been ill for several months and had suffered kidney failure the previous week.  No official determination of cause of death has yet been announced.

Remarking on Koop's death, American Medical Association president Jeremy Lazarus commented, "Because of what he did, and the way he did it, he had a dramatic impact on public health."  The Associated Press called his impact "great",  while The Philadelphia Inquirer called him "a courageous and brilliant pediatric surgeon who pioneered techniques ... and became an outspoken surgeon general".  Writing for The New Yorker, Michael Specter said, "I don't think I have ever met anyone for whom I had more respect... In this era, during which progress, facts, and science are under unrelenting siege, it is thrilling to remember that even ideologues can love the truth."

In popular culture
In The Simpsons season 5, episode 1 "Homer's Barbershop Quartet", Koop is mentioned in the episode as the subject of a song sung by Homer's group.
 In the Futurama season 4, episode 16, "Three Hundred Big Boys", a brand of cigars known as "Royal Kooparillo" shows the likeness of Koop. Koop's likeness appears again in the season 6, episode 21, "Mobius Dick", as the head on Fry's Pez dispenser of heart attack medicine.
 In season 3 episode 17 " The Boy Friend, Part I & II" of Seinfeld, Jerry likens Elaine to C. Everett Koop, because she breaks up with Keith Hernandez for being a smoker.
 In the King of the Hill season 1, episode 6, "Hank's Unmentionable Problem", Peggy watches an advertisement on TV featuring C. Everett Koop. Later she dreams of Hank's funeral, in which C. Everett Koop is giving the eulogy.
 In Psych season 2, episode 7, "If You're So Smart, Then Why Are You Dead?", the Headmaster of a prestigious high school explains that Shawn and Gus beat out C. Everett Koop for the position of annual guest lecturer, in which they taught a class on paranormal studies. According to the Headmaster, "[Koop] was crushed he didn't get it."

Awards and honors

 Public Health Service Distinguished Service Medal
 Public Health Service Meritorious Service Medal
 Surgeon General's Medallion
 Surgeon General's Exemplary Service Medal
 Public Health Service Citation Medal
 Public Health Service Outstanding Unit Citation
 Presidential Medal of Freedom (1995)
 Public Health Service Foreign Duty Service Award
 Public Health Service Regular Corps Ribbon
 Légion d'Honneur (1980)
 Order of Merit of Duarte, Sánchez and Mella, the highest award of the Dominican Republic
 Association of Military Surgeons of the United States with gold star
 Denis Brown Gold Medal by the British Association of Paediatric Surgeons
 William E. Ladd Gold Medal of the American Academy of Pediatrics
 Fellow of the American College of Surgeons (FACS)
 Royal College of Surgeons of England (1982)
 Royal College of Physicians and Surgeons of Glasgow (1987)
 Royal Society of Medicine (1997)
 Honorary Fellowship of the Royal College of Surgeons of Edinburgh (HonFRCS) (2009)
 U.S. Senator John Heinz Award for Greatest Public Service by an Elected or Appointed Official (1988 Jefferson Award)
 Public Welfare Medal from the National Academy of Sciences (1990)
 Albert Schweitzer Prize for Humanitarianism (1991)
 Tyler Prize for Environmental Achievement (1991)
Emmy Award in the News and Documentary category for "C. Everett Koop, MD," a five-part series on health care reform (1991)
 The 2nd Annual Heinz Award in Public Policy (1996)
 Member of the American Academy of Arts and Sciences (1990)
 Member of the American Philosophical Society (1992)

Publications
 
 
 
 Sometimes Mountains Move by C. Everett Koop and Elizabeth Koop. Tyndale, 1974.  (revised edition published by Zondervan in 1994)
 Visible & Palpable Lesions in Children by C. Everett Koop. Grune & Stratton, 1976. 
 The Right to Live, the Right to Die by C. Everett Koop. Tyndale, 1976. 
 Whatever Happened to the Human Race? by Francis A. Schaeffer and C. Everett Koop.  F.H. Revell, 1979.  (revised edition published by Crossway Books in 1983)
 Koop: The Memoirs of America's Family Doctor by C. Everett Koop. Random House, 1991. 
 
 Let's Talk: An Honest Conversation on Critical Issues: Abortion, Euthanasia, AIDS, Health Care by C. Everett Koop and G. Timothy Johnson. Zondervan, 1992. 
 
 
 Critical Issues in Global Health by C. Everett Koop, Clarence E. Pearson, and M. Roy Schwarz. Jossey-Bass, 2001.

References

Further reading
 Soul Survivor: How Thirteen Unlikely Mentors Helped My Faith Survive the Church by Philip Yancey. Galilee/Doubleday, 2003.

External links

 C. Everett Koop Papers (1933–2005) – National Library of Medicine finding aid
 The C. Everett Koop papers – Profiles in Science, National Library of Medicine, National Institutes of Health
 Biography  from the C. Everett Koop Institute at Dartmouth College
 C. Everett Koop (1982-1989) – biography from the Office of the
 C. Everett Koop - His Legacy at LifeStory.com

1916 births
2013 deaths
Activists from New York (state)
American Presbyterians
American anti-abortion activists
American health activists
American pediatric surgeons
American people of Dutch descent
Television personalities from New York City
Anti-smoking activists
Dartmouth College alumni
American disability rights activists
Geisel School of Medicine faculty
HIV/AIDS activists
New York (state) Republicans
People from Brooklyn
Perelman School of Medicine at the University of Pennsylvania alumni
Physicians from New York City
Physicians from Philadelphia
Presidential Medal of Freedom recipients
Reagan administration personnel
Surgeons General of the United States
United States Public Health Service Commissioned Corps admirals
Weill Cornell Medical College alumni
Recipients of the Public Health Service Distinguished Service Medal
Members of the American Philosophical Society
Members of the National Academy of Medicine
Léon Bernard Foundation Prize laureates